Penang Selatan was a federal constituency in Penang, Malaysia, that was represented in the Dewan Rakyat from 1959 to 1974.

The federal constituency was created in the 1974 redistribution and was mandated to return a single member to the Dewan Rakyat under the first past the post voting system.

History
The Penang Selatan parliamentary constituency comprises the predominantly rural areas of Balik Pulau, Bayan Lepas, Sungei Nibong and the urban enclaves of Gelugor and Jelutong. In terms of geographic size, Penang Selatan covers the widest area compared to the other parliamentary constituencies on Penang Island. While the rural areas of the constituency are populated by Alliance controlled Malays, the urban areas of Jelutong and Gelugor are mainly non Malay domains. The first general election of 1959 saw the Alliance candidate, Ismail Idris winning by a thin margin, mainly due to the personality of the losing candidate who was once a Mayor of Georgetown. In 1964, the Alliance candidate Ismail Idris, was re-elected by a thumping majority. However, towards the late 60s, racial segregation and sentiments had reached a peak which caused the Alliance to lose ground in Penang in favor of opposition parties. In the 1969 general elections, future Chief Minister, Lim Chong Eu and his Gerakan party swept power in Penang. Most of the Alliance parliamentary and State Assembly candidates lost their seats. As a result of a national delineation process, the parliamentary constituency of Penang Selatan was abolished in 1974 and was renamed as Balik Pulau parliamentary constituency. Gelugor and Jelutong was regrouped into the newly formed Jelutong parliamentary constituency.

Representation history

State constituency

Election results

References

Defunct Penang federal constituencies